Hugh Hamilton (born 1836 - December 10, 1890) was a Union Navy sailor in the American Civil War and a recipient of the U.S. military's highest decoration, the Medal of Honor, for his actions at the Battle of Mobile Bay.

Military service

Born in 1836 in New York City, Hamilton was still living in the state of New York when he joined the Navy. At the Battle of Mobile Bay on August 5, 1864, he "performed his duties with skill and courage" despite heavy fire. For this action, he was awarded the Medal of Honor four months later, on December 31, 1864.

Medal of Honor citation
Rank and organization: Coxswain, U.S. Navy. Born: 1830, New York, N.Y. Accredited to: New York. G.O. No.: 45, 31 December 1864.

Hamilton's official Medal of Honor citation reads:
On board the U.S.S. Richmond during action against rebel forts and gunboats and with the ram Tennessee in Mobile Bay, 5 August 1864. Despite damage to his ship and the loss of several men on board as enemy fire raked her decks, Hamilton performed his duties with skill and courage throughout the prolonged battle which resulted in the surrender of the rebel ram Tennessee and in the successful attacks carried out on Fort Morgan.

Death and burial
Medal of Honor recipient Hugh Hamilton died December 10, 1890 of cerebral apoplexy and was buried at Oak Grove Cemetery in Fall River, Massachusetts.

Hamilton's death notice in the December 11, 1890 Brooklyn Daily Eagle newspaper read:

Sudden Death of a Quarter Gunner on the Minnesota. Hugh Hamilton, quarter gunner on the training ship Minnesota, now living at the navy yard, fell dead of apoplexy on the forward gun deck of the ship at 3:45 P. M. yesterday. He was 53 years old. Assistant Surgeons Harris and Pickrell applied restoratives shortly after Hamilton fell, but without effect. The body of the deceased will be taken to Fall River to-day.

See also
Navy

Battle of Mobile Bay

Notes

References

External links 
Naval History and Heritage Command: Battle of Mobile Bay - 5 August 1864 - Official reports of Rear Admiral David G. Farragut
Naval History and Heritage Command: NH 69794 USS RICHMOND (1860-1919)

1836 births
1890 deaths
Military personnel from New York City
People of New York (state) in the American Civil War
Union Navy sailors
United States Navy Medal of Honor recipients
American Civil War recipients of the Medal of Honor